Sound City is a British amplification company.

Arbiter, owned by Andrew Landesberg, went into administration in January 2009.  Landesberg went on to purchase six music shops around the UK, and branded them Reverb. In March 2010, Reverb also went into administration. Arbiter, who owned the name Sound City, had a division called Arbiter Entertainment, which was also set up by Landesberg.  Arbiter Entertainment had also gone into administration in 2006.

External links
 
 Sound City Official site

Audio amplifier manufacturers
Audio equipment manufacturers of the United Kingdom
Guitar amplifier manufacturers